Carlos Álvarez Sánchez (born 24 April 1986 in Oviedo, Asturias) is a Spanish footballer who plays for Racing Murcia FC as a striker.

External links

1986 births
Living people
Footballers from Oviedo
Spanish footballers
Association football forwards
Segunda División players
Segunda División B players
Tercera División players
Divisiones Regionales de Fútbol players
CD Covadonga players
Sporting de Gijón B players
Sporting de Gijón players
CD Puertollano footballers
Caudal Deportivo footballers
Gimnástica de Torrelavega footballers
Cádiz CF players
CD Leganés players
Real Murcia players
CF Fuenlabrada footballers
Racing de Santander players
Burgos CF footballers
FC Jumilla players
Racing Murcia FC players